Fred Rauch (Vienna, 28 September 1909 – Gmund am Tegernsee, 1 June 1997) was an Austrian singer and songwriter.

He wrote the original German lyrics "Schütt die Sorgen in ein Gläschen Wein, Mütterlein" with Gerhard Winkler, which became Answer Me with English lyrics of Carl Sigman.

References

1909 births
1997 deaths
20th-century Austrian male singers
Austrian songwriters
Male songwriters
Musicians from Vienna